Modernista may refer to:
Modernisme or Modernista, architecture style also known as Catalan Art Nouveau 
Modernista cocktail